Leo Nile Nicholson (September 30, 1908 – December 1977) was a Canadian politician. He served in the Legislative Assembly of Saskatchewan from 1956 to 1960 as member of the Social Credit party. He was a realtor and farmer, having previously served on the Nipawin Town Council.

References

1908 births
1977 deaths
20th-century Canadian politicians
Social Credit Party of Saskatchewan MLAs